Mukah Division is one of the twelve administrative divisions in Sarawak, Malaysia. It was established on 1 March 2002 and it has a total area of 6,997.61 square kilometres.

Mukah Division contains five administrative districts: Mukah, Dalat,  Daro, Matu and Tanjung Manis District. The total population is 110,543. The population is culturally mixed, with mostly Melanau, Malay, Iban, and Chinese predominating.

Resident Roll of Honor

Development
As a relatively new division in Sarawak, Mukah identifies seven core development sectors. Major rivers in Mukah are Batang Mukah, Batang Oya, Batang Igan and Batang Rajang. The sectors are as follows;
Fishery
Agriculture
Industry
Tourism
Human Resource
Infrastructure and Info-structure
Community Harmonious Lives (Kesejahteraan Hidup Masyarakat)

Infrastructure

After a few years, the division has completed a coastal road that connects Kuala Balingian/Balingian/Mukah/Dalat/Oya/Igan/Matu/Daro.A RM 48 million, 170 meters double-arch suspension bridge over Batang Mukah was opened to public on 16 September 2005.

During the 2014 Balingian by-election, Deputy Prime Minister Tan Sri Muhyiddin Yassin has announced that a new airport will be built for Mukah. The overall cost of the project is estimated at RM 600 million. The earthworks began on 16 April 2014 at a site about 7 kilometers from the town centre. As of February 2015, 16% of the construction was completed.

Education
There are two higher education institutes in the division; UiTM Mukah campus and Mukah Polytechnic. Also, there is a coal power plant built in Matadeng, some 30 km from the Mukah town. In March 2015, Tun Pehin Sri Abdul Taib Mahmud has launched the Laila Taib College (KLT) Mukah Campus. The 35-acre campus is within the Mukah Education Hub and costs RM 336 million. The campus is still under construction.

Fishery
Meanwhile, in Belawai, the fishery sector is being focused. There is Tanjung Manis Deep Sea Fishery Complex to support the sector. Tanjung Manis also connected to Sibu via Serdeng/Tanjung Manis/Bruit/Sg.Nai Road and Sibu/Bawang Assan/Serdeng Road.

The fishery industry is synonym with Mukah town too. The Melanaus are fish lovers and fish are incorporated in traditional dishes, for example umai. Mukah town even has statues of Ikan Merah(Red Snapper) and Udang(Prawn) that 
suggests the importance of the industry to the town and the division wholly.

Shopping malls
Medan Mall
Everwin Supermarket
Glory Supermarket
Mukah Central(Under Construction)

Tourism
Mukah offers a different tourism attraction in Sarawak. Being the only Melanau-majority town, the Melanau culture is the best that Mukah has to offer.

Kaul Festival (Pesta Kaul)
There is a grand Kaul Festival (Pesta Kaul in Malay) held annually at Kala Dana Beach (Pantai Kala Dana in Malay) at Mukah. In 2012, approximately 70,000 visitors attended the festival. A park called Kala Dana Recreation Park or Site of Kaul Festival (Tapak Pesta Kaul) was built there and had recently been renovated and is now more modern. It also has an observation tower. This festival attracts many visitors from Sarawak-wide and sometimes even foreign tourists. The chief minister also attends this festival each year. For 2014, the festival was held on 23–27 April.

Places of interest
Some of the places of interest in Mukah Division are:
Bruit National Park, Daro
Sungai Pasin Wildlife Park, Matu
Kampung Sok Melanau Longhouse, Matu
Sago Farm, Dalat
Kenyana Lake, Mukah
Taman Tanjung Pedada, Kpg. Tanjung, Mukah
Kala Dana Recreation Park, Mukah
Setia Raja Boulevard Recreation Park, Mukah
Blue Horizon Beach, Mukah
Kampung Kuala Hilir Oya, Dalat
Telaga Penawar Kampung Jemoreng, Matu
Belawai Beach, Daro
Lamin Dana (Traditional Melanau Longhouse), Mukah
Pantai Kampung Judan Hilir, Mukah

Agriculture
The main agricultural products are oil palm, sago, paddy, pineapple and aquaculture.

Industry
In 1996, the Mukah Light Industrial Estate was established by the Mukah river, about 3 km from the Mukah town. The planned area covers 61 hectares. The other industrial estate in Mukah Division is the Tanjung Manis Timber Processing Zone developed by Sarawak Timber Industry Development Corporation (STIDC).

Demography

Ethnic groups

As of 2010, Melanau is the largest ethnic group in Mukah Division with more than half of the population identified themselves as Melanau. Iban is the second largest with 18.6% of the population.

Admistrition

Members of Parliament

References

External links

 Mukah Tourism

 
2002 establishments in Malaysia